Salleh Ibrahim (15 October 1947 – 8 March 2020) was a Malaysian footballer. A prison officer by profession (as Malaysian football was not professional in his time), Salleh represented Prison Department, Kelantan FA, Perak FA and Singapore FA during his football career. He also played for Malaysian national team, and competed in the men's tournament at the 1972 Summer Olympics, scoring in the 3–0 win against the United States in the group stage.

In 2004, he was inducted in Olympic Council of Malaysia's Hall of Fame for 1972 Summer Olympics football team.

Honours
Singapore
 Malaysia Cup: 1965

References

External links
 

1947 births
2020 deaths
Malaysian footballers
Malaysia international footballers
Olympic footballers of Malaysia
Footballers at the 1972 Summer Olympics
Place of birth missing
Association football forwards
People from Kelantan